Ghaamsberg is a mountain in South Africa. situated just east of Aggeneys, in the Namakwa District Municipality of the Northern Cape province, 33 km to the south of the border with Namibia. Its summit is 1148 metres above sea level.

It is noted for its biological diversity. The unique ecologies on the various inselbergs, peaks, hills and plains in the vicinity, having varied rocky and shallow soil substrates, support a wide diversity of plants, animals, birds and insects, including rare and endemic species, a number of them threatened.  The writer William Charles Scully wrote that, “for sheer uncompromising aridity, for stark grotesque naked horror, these mountains stand probably unsurpassed on the face of the globe.”

This mountain should not be confused with Gamsberg, a mountain in Namibia.

There are proposals for an open-cast zinc mine on its summit.

The mine was officially opened on Thursday 28 February 2019 by South African President Cyril Ramaphosa. The first blast of Phase 1 was in July 2015, with an access ramp being completed in April 2017.

During November 2017,Vedanta Zinc International (VZI) announce a collaboration with General Electric and mining software developer MineRP. The initial stage of this collaboration will be part of the "Smart Ore Movement" launch at the Gamsberg mine.

References

External links
Hydrogeology of Groundwater - Bushmanland

Mountains of South Africa
Namaqualand
Landforms of the Northern Cape